Hilton Tel Aviv belongs to the international hotel chain Hilton. It was refurbished and now is a standard higher than the average Hilton hotel.

Location

The hotel is located in the Independence Park, with direct access to the Hilton Public Beach and the Tel Aviv Promenade, in the heart of Tel Aviv.

History

Construction work began on September 13, 1962. The building was built by architect Yaakov Rechter, in the style of late modernism. During its construction three workers were killed. The official opening of the hotel took place on 13 September 1965 with the participation of Prime Minister Levi Eshkol. It was the biggest and most modern hotel in town.

In 1982, the International Conference on the Holocaust and Genocide took place in the hotel.

In 1970 the building underwent major upgrades. The east wing was added, so that each floor had an additional 12 rooms. In 2000 the hotel underwent a complete renovation. In 2016 the Vista Lounge on the 17th floor was completely redone, and in 2017 the Hotel Lobby was also renovated. The rooms are undergoing renovations yearly.

Pop culture
The hotel plays a prominent role in Nicole Krauss's 2017 novel Forest Dark.

References

Hotels in Tel Aviv
Tel Aviv
Hotels established in 1965
Hotel buildings completed in 1965
1965 establishments in Israel
Modernist architecture in Israel
Yaakov Rechter buildings